A Pair of Aces is a collection of novellas and screenplays written by American author Joe R. Lansdale and Neal Barrett Jr. At this time it is only available as an Amazon Kindle e-book. For the first time he writes a screenplay for his classic horror novel The Nightrunners.

Table of contents
Introduction by Joe R. Lansdale
Author's Introduction to Written With a Razor
Written with a Razor
Short Stories
Author's Note to The God of the Razor
The God of the Razor
King of shadows
Janet Finds the Razor

Screenplay
The Nightrunners
Screenplay By Joe R. Lansdale and Neal Barrett Jr.
Based on the novel by Joe R. Lansdale
Short Story
The Magic Wagon
Bonus
Excerpt From The Drive-In: A "B" Movie with Blood & Popcorn, Made in Texas

References

External links
Joe R. Lansdale's Official Website
Neal Barrett Jr.'s Official Website
Crossroads Press Official Website

Short story collections by Joe R. Lansdale
Works by Joe R. Lansdale
Ebooks
2014 short story collections